Kunhardt is a surname. Notable people with the surname include:

Dorothy Kunhardt (1901–1979), American children's book author
Erich E. Kunhardt (1949–2014), Dominican American physicist
Peter Kunhardt, American documentary film director
Peter W. Kunhardt Jr., American arts administrator

See also
Kuhardt